Enrique "Tet" Garcia Jr. (September 13, 1940 – June 13, 2016) was a Filipino politician who served as the governor of Bataan from 1992 until 1994, and again from 2004 until 2013. He served five non-consecutive terms as a congressman from Bataan's 2nd congressional district. He died during his third stint in the House in 2016.

Early life and education
Enrique "Tet" Garcia Jr. was born on September 13, 1940  in Pasay to Enrique Garcia Sr., and Emiliana Tuazon Garcia. He is the eldest of 10 children of his parents.

As a child, Garcia attended Balanga Elementary School from 1947 to 1953. He attended Bataan National High School from 1953 to 1957, graduating as the Salutatorian of the class.

He attended De La Salle University and earned his bachelor's degree in business administration in 1963.

Congressman, governor of Bataan, and later life
Garcia entered politics in 1987 when he was elected  Congressman representing the 2nd district of Bataan. In 1992 he was elected as the Governor of Bataan. He lost a recall election in 1993. He later returned to serve as Congressman from Bataan's 2nd district from 1995 to 2004. In 2004, he was elected again as Governor of Bataan, and won reelection in 2007. He ran as the incumbent Governor of Bataan in the 2010 elections, and won with 212,808 votes, which resulted in an almost 80,000 vote margin.

Garcia died on June 13, 2016. He was 75.

Accomplishments

Garcia entered politics in 1987 and was elected to  the House of Representatives, representing the 2nd district of Bataan.  Since then he has been credited with numerous accomplishments, only a few of which are listed below.

Fight To Keep Petrochemical Industry in Limay, Bataan

During Garcia's first term in the Philippine Congress, from 1987 to 1992, he became widely known for vigorously and ultimately successfully fighting to keep the petrochemical industry in the province of Bataan. Arguing that the transfer of the petrochemical plant to Batangas was unfair to Bataan and to the Philippines as a whole, he fought the plant's transfer all the way to the Supreme Court in a landmark case. On August 24, 1990, to emphasize his belief in the truth and importance of what he was fighting for, Garcia took an emphatic leave of absence from the House of Representatives and vowed to resign if the petrochemical plant's transfer was not stopped. Garcia had filed a petition before hand asking the Supreme Court to stop the transfer of the Petrochemical plant to Batangas.  On November 9, 1990, the Supreme Court of the Philippines issued its final decision on Garcia's petition, G.R. No. 92024  and ruled that the Philippines' Board of Investments had indeed erred in approving the transfer of Luzon Petrochemical Corporation from Bataan to Batangas, and that the Board of Investments also erred in approving the change in feedstock from naptha only to "naphtha and/or liquefied petroleum gas;".  The Court ordered that the original certificate of registration of Bataan Petrochemical Plant, wherein it operates in Limay, Bataan, be maintained.  The Court agreed with Garcia that the intended transfer of the Petrochemical Plant from Bataan to Batangas was disadvantageous to the national government and to the province of Bataan on a variety of grounds.

Garcia triumphantly returned to the House of Representatives after the Supreme Court issued its decision, and triumphantly proclaimed that the Supreme Court ruling vindicated his monumental "fight for justice."

The Creation Of The Bataan Polytechnic State College

In February 1998, then Congressman Enrique 'Tet' Garcia was able to get his bill creating the Bataan Polytechnic State College (now the Bataan Peninsula State University) passed into law, Republic Act No. 8562, titled 'An Act Converting The Medina Lacson De Leon School Of Arts And Trades In The Municipality Of Balanga, Province Of Bataan, Into A Chartered State College, To Be Known As The Bataan Polytechnic State College, Integrating Therewith The Bataan Community Colleges In The Municipality Of Balanga, Province of Bataan, And Appropriating Funds Therefor'.
This law enabled the college education systems in Bataan to receive much more in assistance from the national government, amounting to more than 70 million pesos yearly.
In March 2007, through the efforts of then Congressman Albert S. Garcia, and building on the earlier work of now Governor Enrique T. Garcia, the Bataan Polytechnic State College system became the Bataan Peninsula State University system, integrating various campuses province wide.

Conversion of the municipality of Balanga into a city 

During his congressional term from 1998 to 2001, then congressman Enrique 'Tet' Garcia was able to get his bill converting the municipality of Balanga into a city, passed into law. Republic Act No. 8984, 'AN ACT CONVERTING THE MUNICIPALITY OF BALANGA, BATAAN PROVINCE INTO A COMPONENT CITY TO BE KNOWN AS THE CITY OF BALANGA' became law in December 2000. then congressman Tet Garcia was aided in getting this bill passed into law through the efforts of his son Albert S. Garcia, who was mayor of Balanga at this time. The conversion of Balanga into a component city enabled it to receive a larger share of the revenue allotment from the national government, along with numerous other benefits and advantages. Thus it was through this act that Balanga has grown by leaps and bounds economically as a city since then.

Closing The BIR Tax Checks Loophole

In the years from 1978 to 2003, there had been a loophole in the BIR check payment system that was taken advantage of by syndicates who were then successful of stealing billions of pesos from the Philippine government.  
From the year 2000 to 2003, then Congressman Enrique Garcia devised and recommended simple solutions on how to stop the BIR check tax payment loopholes.  These recommendations were publicized and taken account of by Philippine Star columnist Federico Pascual in his July 15, 2003, article titled 'Garcia programs can save P100B for gov’t'.

On October 27, 2003, the Department of Finance finally adopted Garcia's recommendations by issuing Clearing House Operating Memo (CHOM) No. 375.

On May 9, 2008, the Philippine Clearing House Corporation through Clearing House Operating Memo (CHOM) No. 427, adopted an additional recommendation of Garcia, which was to have the name of the government institution indicated on the tracer band to be painted/sprayed at the back of the checks.  According to the memo, this would act as an "additional control/tracing point for the banks in proving their inward cheques that are payable to the BIR or BOC."

Bataan Iskolar Ng Bayan Program

The provincial government of the Province of Bataan under Governor Garcia started the 'Iskolar ng Bayan' scholarship program for college students in 2004  As of early 2010 there were 9000 current scholars, with the aim of increasing the number further to 12000 scholars after May 2010. Currently, 3000 scholars are from the 1st District of Bataan, while 6000 scholars are from the 2nd District of Bataan.
  
The scholarship program is open to college level students who are permanent residents of Bataan. The scholarship can be used for any college level institution, whether inside or outside the province. 
In 2008, Governor Enrique 'Tet' Garcia's provincial office contributed P20,000,000 to the program, while Congressman Albert Garcia of the 2nd district of Bataan contributed P10,000,000 to the program. Mayor Joet Garcia further contributed P10,000,000 to the program. 
This is one of the largest scholarship programs ever instituted in the Philippines for college level students.

Garcia-Mandanas Supreme Court Ruling on Local Governments' Just Share of all National Taxes

External links

References

1940 births
2016 deaths
Governors of Bataan
Members of the House of Representatives of the Philippines from Bataan
Lakas–CMD politicians
National Unity Party (Philippines) politicians
De La Salle University alumni